Choi Young-eun (born October 12, 1983 in Seoul, South Korea) is a South Korean figure skater. She is the 1998 South Korean national bronze medalist. Her highest placement at an ISU Championship was 10th at the 2000 Four Continents Figure Skating Championships.

Programs

Results
JGP: Junior Grand Prix

References

External links
 

1983 births
Living people
Figure skaters from Seoul
South Korean female single skaters
Competitors at the 2003 Winter Universiade